Zuddas is a surname. Notable people with the surname include:

Gianluigi Zuddas (born 1943), Italian author and translator
Giovanni Zuddas (1928–1996), Italian bantamweight professional boxer

See also
 Zuidas